Lalji is both a given name and a surname. Notable people with the name include:

 Farhan Lalji, Pakistani Canadian sports reporter
 Lalji Singh (1947–2017), Indian scientist
 Lalji Tandon (1935–2020), Indian politician

Arabic-language surnames
Arabic masculine given names